Piscataway is a township in Middlesex County, in the U.S. state of New Jersey. It is a suburb of the New York metropolitan area, in the Raritan Valley. As of the 2020 United States census, the township's population was 60,804, an increase of 4,760 (+8.5%) from the 2010 census count of 56,044, which in turn reflected an increase of 5,562 (+11.0%) from 50,482 at the 2000 census.

The area was appropriated in 1666 by Quakers and Baptists who had left the Puritan colony in New Hampshire.

Piscataway Township was formed on December 18, 1666, and officially incorporated by an act of the New Jersey Legislature on February 21, 1798, as part of the state's initial group of 104 townships. The community, the fifth-oldest municipality in New Jersey, has grown from Native American territory, through a colonial period and is one of the links in the earliest settlement of the Atlantic Ocean seacoast that ultimately led to the formation of the United States. Over the years, portions of Piscataway were taken to form Raritan Township (March 17, 1870, now Edison), Dunellen (October 28, 1887), Middlesex (April 9, 1913) and South Plainfield (March 10, 1926).

Rutgers University's main campus spills into the township. SHI Stadium, home field for the Rutgers Scarlet Knights football team, is in Piscataway  as well as part of the Robert Wood Johnson Medical School.

History
The earliest settlers of the area were the Lenape Native Americans; a group of four European settlers coming from New Hampshire acquired  of land in 1666 that had been occupied by Native Americans.
 
In 1666, the first proprietary Governor of the Province of New Jersey, Philip Carteret, granted 12 new settlers from Massachusetts a 100 square mile allotment of land that was later founded as the townships of Piscataway and Woodbridge. Similar types of settlements established by religious dissenters fleeing Puritan colonies in New England were being formed in other parts of New Jersey, notably the Elizabethtown Tract in Northern New Jersey near the mouth of the Raritan River and extending upwards into modern day Essex County, and the Monmouth Tract in Central New Jersey near the Raritan Bay and extending southward along the Jersey Shore to the Barnegat Inlet.

Additional settlers from the Piscataqua River area of New Hampshire moved to Piscataway, bringing the name. Coming from a lumbering, shipbuilding and fishing background, these settlers, consisting of mostly Baptists and Quakers, were comfortable with their new surroundings, and looking forward to starting a new life away from political and religious persecution in the north. They were also enterprising and pioneering families who were already experienced in wilderness settlement. Before the original settlers, there were pioneer scouts who surveyed these new lands and waterways. The town name of Piscataway came from these early pioneers who originally came from the town of Piscataqua. During the original land purchase, the pioneers had signed 12 Articles of Agreement with Governor Carteret, which served as the legal basis for the government of Piscataway and Woodbridge and which shaped the democratic development of self-government. In short, these articles were mainly designed to provide liberty and land ownership for new families and to allow them to establish their own government representatives and religious freedoms.

After a few line and boundary changes, Piscataway and its outer plantations were reported to total 40,000 acres, with 66 square miles of land in 1685. The Lenape Native Americans had settled the entire Piscataway area, but were quietly displaced to smaller areas as numbers of European settlers increased. The Lenape had established defined trails that European settlers used to travel through the wilderness area and branch out to new lands. Over time, many of these primitive trails became the main routes of travel between communities and became the basis of roads that still exist today. The trails along the Raritan River were named after a local Indian tribe called the Raritangs. Piscataway Township is the fifth-oldest municipality in New Jersey and among the fifty oldest municipalities in the United States.

On February 8, 1777, the Battle of Quibbletown, a running battle took place between approximately 2,000 British and Hessian troops under the command of British General Charles Lord Cornwallis and the local patriot militia led by Colonel Charles Scott and a separate militia commanded by Brigadier General Nathaniel Warner.

Geography
According to the United States Census Bureau, the township had a total area of 18.96 square miles (49.11 km2), including 18.79 square miles (48.68 km2) of land and 0.17 square miles (0.43 km2) of water (0.88%).

The township lies on the south side of the Raritan Valley, a line of cities in Central Jersey, along with New Brunswick, Highland Park and South Plainfield. Piscataway is 45 minutes southwest of New York City and 53 minutes northeast of Philadelphia.

Piscataway is bordered by nine municipalities: Dunellen, Edison, Highland Park, Middlesex, New Brunswick and South Plainfield in Middlesex County; Franklin Township and South Bound Brook in Somerset County; and Plainfield in Union County.

Society Hill (with a 2010 Census population of 3,829) is an unincorporated community and census-designated place (CDP) located within Piscataway Township.

Piscataway is often segmented by local residents into unincorporated communities, localities and place names which include Arbor, Bound Brook Heights ("the Heights"), Fellowship Farm, Fieldville, Johnson Park, Lake Nelson, New Brunswick Highlands, New Market (known as Quibbletown in the 18th Century), Newtown, North Stelton, Possumtown, Randolphville, Raritan Landing and Riverview Manor. The original settlement of Piscatawaytown is located in present-day Edison.

Troops were quartered at Camp Kilmer in preparation for transport to the European Theater of Operations in World War II, ultimately becoming the largest processing center for troops heading overseas and returning from World War II, processing over 2.5 million soldiers. Following the failed 1956 Hungarian Revolution, Camp Kilmer was reactivated and used to process 30,000 refugees who were resettled in the area and across the country. The camp was officially closed in 2009.

Significant portions of Piscataway make up the Livingston and Busch Campuses of Rutgers University.

The Arbor and New Brunswick Highland sections of Piscataway were African American neighborhoods in the past.

The New Market section historically comprised the Quaker village of Quibbletown. The early name of the village originated from the fact that settlers of different religious denominations quibbled about whether the Sabbath should be observed on Saturday or on Sunday in the village.

Demographics

2010 census

The Census Bureau's 2006–2010 American Community Survey showed that (in 2010 inflation-adjusted dollars) median household income was $88,428 (with a margin of error of +/− $3,958) and the median family income was $95,483 (+/− $3,327). Males had a median income of $57,308 (+/− $4,335) versus $48,606 (+/− $1,863) for females. The per capita income for the borough was $31,254 (+/− $1,335). About 2.5% of families and 4.3% of the population were below the poverty line, including 3.9% of those under age 18 and 4.5% of those age 65 or over.

2000 census
As of the 2000 United States census there were 50,482 people, 16,500 households, and 12,325 families residing in the township. The population density was 2,688.6 people per square mile (1,037.9/km2). There were 16,946 housing units at an average density of 902.5 per square mile (348.4/km2). The racial makeup of the township was 48.81% White, 20.31% African American, 0.21% Native American, 24.80% Asian, 0.03% Pacific Islander, 3.08% from other races, and 2.77% from two or more races. Hispanic or Latino of any race were 7.93% of the population.

As of the 2000 Census, 12.49% of Piscataway's residents identified themselves as being of Indian American ancestry, which was the fourth highest of any municipality in the United States and the third highest in New Jersey—behind Edison (17.75%) and Plainsboro Township (16.97%)—of all places with 1,000 or more residents identifying their ancestry.

There were 16,500 households, out of which 34.6% had children under the age of 18 living with them, 60.6% were married couples living together, 10.4% had a female householder with no husband present, and 25.3% were non-families. 19.5% of all households were made up of individuals, and 5.4% had someone living alone who was 65 years of age or older. The average household size was 2.84 and the average family size was 3.29.

In the township, the population was spread out, with 21.9% under the age of 18, 14.1% from 18 to 24, 33.3% from 25 to 44, 22.1% from 45 to 64, and 8.7% who were 65 years of age or older. The median age was 33 years. For every 100 females, there were 97.9 males. For every 100 females age 18 and over, there were 95.2 males.

The median income for a household in the township was $68,721, and the median income for a family was $75,218. Males had a median income of $47,188 versus $36,271 for females. The per capita income for the township was $26,321. About 2.7% of families and 3.8% of the population were below the poverty line, including 3.3% of those under age 18 and 4.3% of those age 65 or over.

Economy

Corporate residents of Piscataway include:
 American Standard Brands
 Cintas Corporation
 Colgate-Palmolive, Research and Development
 Gorgias Press, an academic publisher that specializes on Eastern Christianity.
 Hapag-Lloyd America, an international shipping company.
 IEEE
 Ingersoll Rand and its wholly owned subsidiary Trane
 Johnson & Johnson Health Care Systems Inc.
 Pepsi Cola Bottling Group – bottling plant.
 Siemens Hearing Instruments, the world's largest manufacturer of hearing aids.
 Telcordia Technologies, World Headquarters

Sports
SHI Stadium was originally constructed in 1994 with 41,500 seats as the home of the Rutgers Scarlet Knights football team and was expanded to a capacity of 52,454 in 2009 after a $100-million expansion.

Louis Brown Athletic Center is the home of the Rutgers University men's and women's basketball teams. The venue was originally named the Rutgers Athletic Center, still called the RAC by many, and can accommodate 9,000 attendees. The athletic center was the home of the professional New Jersey Nets for the four seasons from 1977–1981 after moving from New York and before the Meadowlands Arena was completed.

Yurcak Field is a multi-purpose soccer and lacrosse stadium, built in 1994, and holds 5,000 people. The stadium is officially named "The Soccer/Lacrosse Stadium at Yurcak Field" in honor of Ronald N. Yurcak, a 1965 All-American Rutgers lacrosse player. Rutgers University host their home games at this stadium.

Government

Local government 
In November 1966, Piscataway voters, under the Faulkner Act, approved a Charter Study and elected a Charter Study Commission to recommend the form of government best suited to the township's needs. The Commission recommended Mayor-Council Plan F. Voters approved the plan in a referendum in November 1967 and the new form of government was inaugurated on January 1, 1969. The township is one of 71 municipalities (of the 564) statewide governed under this form. Under Plan F the Mayor is the administrator and the Council is the legislative body. A full-time business administrator, appointed by the Mayor with the advice and consent of the Council, and responsible to the Mayor, supervises the day-by-day operation of municipal government. The Township Council has seven members, one representing each of four wards, and three at-large members. The Mayor and Council members serve four-year terms on a staggered basis, with either the three at-large seats (and the mayoral seat) or the four ward seats up for vote in even years as part of the November general election.

, the mayor of Piscataway is Democrat Brian C. Wahler, whose term of office ends December 31, 2024. Members of the Township Council are Council President Michele Lombardi (D, 2022; Ward 4), Council Vice President Frank Uhrin (D, 2022; Ward 1), Jim Bullard (D, 2022; Ward 2), Gabrielle Cahill (D, 2024; At Large), Steven D. Cahn (D, 2022; Ward 3), Linwood D. Rouse (D, 2024; At Large – appointed to serve an unexpired term) and Kapil K. Shah (D, 2024; At Large).

In May 2021, the Township Council appointed Linwood D. Rouse to fill the at-large seat expiring in December 2024 that had been held by Chanelle Scott McCullum until she stepped down to take a seat on the Middlesex County Board of County Commissioners following the death of Commissioner Kenneth Armwood. Rouse served on an interim basis until the November 2021 election, when he was elected to serve the balance of the term of office.

Camille Fernicola was appointed to fill the at-large seat expiring in December 2016 that had been held by Michael Griffith until his death in November 2014. In the November 2015 general election, Fernicola was elected to serve the balance of the term of office.

Chanelle McCullum was appointed in April 2013 to fill the vacant at-large seat of Kenneth Armwood, who had been the township council president until he was appointed to fill a vacant seat on the Middlesex County Board of Chosen Freeholders. McCullum was elected in November 2013 to serve the balance of the unexpired term through its expiration in December 2016.

Federal, state and county representation 
Piscataway is located in the 6th Congressional District and is part of New Jersey's 17th state legislative district.

 

Middlesex County is governed by a Board of County Commissioners, whose seven members are elected at-large on a partisan basis to serve three-year terms of office on a staggered basis, with either two or three seats coming up for election each year as part of the November general election. At an annual reorganization meeting held in January, the board selects from among its members a commissioner director and deputy director. , Middlesex County's Commissioners (with party affiliation, term-end year, and residence listed in parentheses) are 
Commissioner Director Ronald G. Rios (D, Carteret, term as commissioner ends December 31, 2024; term as commissioner director ends 2022),
Commissioner Deputy Director Shanti Narra (D, North Brunswick, term as commissioner ends 2024; term as deputy director ends 2022),
Claribel A. "Clary" Azcona-Barber (D, New Brunswick, 2022),
Charles Kenny (D, Woodbridge Township, 2022),
Leslie Koppel (D, Monroe Township, 2023),
Chanelle Scott McCullum (D, Piscataway, 2024) and 
Charles E. Tomaro (D, Edison, 2023).
Constitutional officers are
County Clerk Nancy Pinkin (D, 2025, East Brunswick),
Sheriff Mildred S. Scott (D, 2022, Piscataway) and 
Surrogate Claribel Cortes (D, 2026; North Brunswick).

Politics
As of March 2011, there were a total of 31,266 registered voters in Piscataway Township, of which 11,355 (36.3%) were registered as Democrats, 3,034 (9.7%) were registered as Republicans and 16,859 (53.9%) were registered as Unaffiliated. There were 18 voters registered to other parties.

In the 2012 presidential election, Democrat Barack Obama received 74.4% of the vote (15,659 cast), ahead of Republican Mitt Romney with 24.4% (5,125 votes), and other candidates with 1.2% (262 votes), among the 21,227 ballots cast by the township's 33,597 registered voters (181 ballots were spoiled), for a turnout of 63.2%. In the 2008 presidential election, Democrat Barack Obama received 71.0% of the vote (15,978 cast), ahead of Republican John McCain with 27.2% (6,111 votes) and other candidates with 1.0% (215 votes), among the 22,491 ballots cast by the township's 32,398 registered voters, for a turnout of 69.4%. In the 2004 presidential election, Democrat John Kerry received 64.2% of the vote (12,627 ballots cast), outpolling Republican George W. Bush with 34.3% (6,749 votes) and other candidates with 0.8% (218 votes), among the 19,670 ballots cast by the township's 27,842 registered voters, for a turnout percentage of 70.6.

In the 2013 gubernatorial election, Democrat Barbara Buono received 50.6% of the vote (5,388 cast), ahead of Republican Chris Christie with 48.2% (5,129 votes), and other candidates with 1.1% (122 votes), among the 10,823 ballots cast by the township's 34,170 registered voters (184 ballots were spoiled), for a turnout of 31.7%. In the 2009 gubernatorial election, Democrat Jon Corzine received 54.9% of the vote (6,773 ballots cast), ahead of Republican Chris Christie with 37.6% (4,637 votes), Independent Chris Daggett with 6.0% (738 votes) and other candidates with 0.9% (111 votes), among the 12,334 ballots cast by the township's 31,079 registered voters, yielding a 39.7% turnout.

Emergency services

Fire and EMS 
Piscataway is divided into four fire districts which are served by a total of two volunteer rescue squads and six volunteer fire companies, one of which combines both fire and EMS services. The fire districts are the zones in which fire departments operate, and although the volunteer EMS squads follow the basic regions of the districts, only North Stelton Fire Rescue EMS is a part of a fire district. On weekdays and weekends from 6 am until 6 pm, Hackensack Meridian Health EMS staffs an ambulance in Piscataway. When the volunteer rescue squads are not in service, either Hackensack Meridian Health, Rutgers University Emergency Services or Robert Wood Johnson University Hospital may be asked to send an ambulance.

District 1
 Arbor Rescue Squad (EMS), 1790 W. 7th Street (partial coverage)
 River Road Rescue Squad (EMS), 101 Shirley Parkway (partial coverage)
 New Market Fire Company, 801 South Washington Avenue
 North Stelton Fire Rescue (EMS), 70 Haines Avenue (partial coverage)

District 2
 River Road Rescue Squad (EMS), 101 Shirley Parkway
 River Road Fire Company, 102 Netherwood Avenue
 Holmes Marshall Fire Company, 5300 Deborah Drive
 Possumtown Fire Company, 85 Stratton Street South

District 3
 Arbor Rescue Squad (EMS), 1790 W. 7th Street
 Arbor Hose Company, 1780 West Seventh Street

District 4
 North Stelton Volunteer Fire Company, 70 Haines Avenue

Fire Prevention
Fire Marshall's Office, 555 Sidney Road

Police 
The primary law enforcement agency in the township is the Piscataway Police Department. Rutgers University Police Department operates on its campuses within Piscataway. The New Jersey State Police patrols the section of Interstate 287 that bisects the township.

Education 
The Piscataway Township Schools serves students in pre-kindergarten through twelfth grades. As of the 2018–19 school year, the district, comprised of 10 schools, had an enrollment of 7,161 students and 530.1 classroom teachers (on an FTE basis), for a student–teacher ratio of 13.5:1. In addition to its high school, there are four schools for K–3, two intermediate schools serving grades 4–5 and three middle schools for students in grades 6–8. Schools in the district (with 2018–19 enrollment data from the National Center for Education Statistics) are 
Dwight D. Eisenhower Elementary School (506 students; in grades K–3), 
Grandview Elementary School (789; Pre-K–3), 
Knollwood Elementary School (505; K–3), 
Randolphville Elementary School (469; K–3), 
Arbor Intermediate School (585; 4–5), 
Martin Luther King Intermediate School (4–5), 
Conackamack Middle School (472; 6–8), 
Quibbletown Middle School (485; 6–8), 
Theodore Schor Middle School (576; 6–8) and 
Piscataway Township High School (2,267; 9–12).

Middlesex County schools
Eighth grade students from all of Middlesex County are eligible to apply to attend the high school programs offered by the Middlesex County Vocational and Technical Schools, a county-wide vocational school district that offers full-time career and technical education at Middlesex County Academy in Edison, the Academy for Allied Health and Biomedical Sciences in Woodbridge Township and at its East Brunswick, Perth Amboy and Piscataway technical high schools, with no tuition charged to students for attendance.

Other Middlesex County schools in Piscataway include:
 Nuview Academy Piscataway Campus, 1 Park Avenue – Programs for students with symptoms of; Depression, ADHD, Conduct Disorder, Thought Disorder, or Anxiety Disorder.
 Bright Beginnings Learning Center, 1660 Stelton Road – Programs for students with Autism.
 Piscataway Regional Day School, 1670 Stelton Road – Programs for students with Autism.
 Raritan Valley Academy, 1690 Stelton Road – Programs for students with behavioral disabilities, learning and/or language disabilities.

Private schools
 Lake Nelson Seventh-day Adventist Academy, opened in February 1959, serves students in Pre-K to tenth grade.
 Timothy Christian School is a K–12 that was founded in 1949.
 An-Noor Academy, a Pre-K–12 school that has served the area's Muslim community since 2000.

Colleges and continuing education
 Rutgers University Busch and Livingston Campuses
 Rutgers Biomedical and Health Sciences Center for Advanced Biotechnology and Medicine and University Behavioral HealthCare (which overlaps with Rutgers Busch Campus)
 StenoTech Career Institute is a technical school that offers court reporting and medical transcription training.

Transportation

Roads and highways

Piscataway is served by a number of roads and highways. Interstate 287 traverses the township and includes exits 6, 7, 8 and 9. County roads include CR 501 (along the border with South Plainfield) and CR 529.

Other limited access roads that are accessible include the New Jersey Turnpike (Interstate 95) in East Brunswick (Exit 9) and neighboring Edison (Exit 10).

Public transportation
NJ Transit provides bus service to and from the Port Authority Bus Terminal in Midtown Manhattan on the 114 route, to Newark on the 65 and 66 routes, local service on the 819 line and additional service on the 980 route. Train service is not available in Piscataway, but service is available on the Raritan Valley Line at the Dunellen station and on the Northeast Corridor at the Edison station.

Taiwanese airline EVA Air provides a private bus service to and from John F. Kennedy International Airport in New York City for customers based in New Jersey. This service stops in Piscataway.

Points of interest
 WVPH is the community radio station of Piscataway High School and Rutgers University.
 Ferrer Colony and Modern School and Fellowship Farm Cooperative Association are the remnants of the 1910s Utopian societies.
 Road Up Raritan Historic District includes nine historic homes along River Road and was listed on the National Register of Historic Places in 1999.
 Metlar-Bodine House is a museum dedicated to the history of Piscataway "from Indian trails to Interstate" and was established in 1979 in a house whose earliest portions date to 1728.
 Cornelius Low House, constructed in 1741 and listed on the National Register of Historic Places, is operated as a Middlesex County Museum.
 East Jersey Old Town Village, located in Johnson Park, includes 16 homes characteristic of the farm houses that populated the area, that have been relocated and reconstructed on the site.

Notable people

People who were born in, residents of, or otherwise closely associated with Piscataway include:

 Mike Alexander (born 1965), former NFL wide receiver
 Edward Antill (1701–1770), colonial plantation owner, attorney, and early politician in New Jersey colony
 Edward Antill (1742–1789), soldier who fought at the Battle of Quebec and was the son of the politician with the same name
 Melissa Bacelar (born 1979), horror film actress
 Justin Bailey (born 1977), basketball player for University of Hartford and then foreign professional teams for 13 years
 Samuel E. Blum (1920–2013), chemist and physicist who developed the ultraviolet excimer laser
 Marvin Booker (born 1990), linebacker who has played in the NFL for the Tampa Bay Buccaneers
 Ralph Bowen (born 1961), Canadian-born jazz saxophonist
 Anthony Branker (born 1958), jazz musician and educator
 John Celestand (born 1977), 30th pick of 1999 NBA Draft by the Los Angeles Lakers
 Mark Ciardi (born 1961), film producer and former Major League Baseball pitcher
 Marc Cintron (born 1990), professional soccer player
 Anthony Davis (born 1989), offensive tackle for the San Francisco 49ers
 Dwayne Gratz (born 1990), cornerback who has played in the NFL for the Jacksonville Jaguars
 J. D. Griggs (born 1990), defensive end who has played in the Canadian Football League for the Winnipeg Blue Bombers
 Rachael Hip-Flores, actress who has appeared in Good People in Love and the web series Anyone But Me
 Malcolm Jenkins (born 1987), safety for the New Orleans Saints. Played college football for the Ohio State Buckeyes
 Asjha Jones (born 1980), WNBA basketball player for the Connecticut Sun
 Joe Lizura (born 1961), television meteorologist, who has also been an actor, spokesperson, author and television show developer, writer and producer
 Isaac Low (1735–1791), member of the First Continental Congress in 1774 who opposed armed conflict with the British and left the American side after the Declaration of Independence
 Nicholas Low (1739–1826), merchant, developer, and younger brother of Isaac
 Lisa Marie (born 1968), actress who has appeared in Planet of the Apes and Sleepy Hollow
 Luther Martin (1748–1826), Founding Father who refused to sign the United States Constitution as it violated states' rights in his view
 Raqiyah Mays (born 1978), actress and hip-hop journalist
 Richard Levis McCormick (born 1947), 19th President of Rutgers University
 Richard P. McCormick (1916–2006), historian and professor emeritus at Rutgers University, who served as president of the New Jersey Historical Society
 Matt Nagy (born 1978), head coach of the Chicago Bears who played in the Arena Football League
 Derrick Palmer (born 1988/89), labor activist and whistleblower who is Vice President of Organizing of the Amazon Labor Union.
 Joseph Fitz Randolph (1803–1873), member of the United States House of Representatives from New Jersey from 1837 to 1843
 Brandon Renkart (born 1984), practice squad player for the Arizona Cardinals
 Paul Rudnick (born 1957), playwright, novelist, screenwriter and essayist
 Gail Shollar (1957–1992), early victim of carjacking, whose death led to stricter state penalties for the crime
 Bob Smith (born 1947), member of the New Jersey Senate since 2002 who spent five years as mayor of Piscataway
 Karl-Anthony Towns (born 1995), NBA basketball player for the Minnesota Timberwolves
 Kyle Wilson (born 1987), cornerback for the New York Jets
 Eric Young Jr. (born 1985), second baseman and outfielder who has played for the New York Mets

References

External links

Piscataway Township website
Piscataway Township Schools

School Data for the Piscataway Township Schools, National Center for Education Statistics
Township code

 
1693 establishments in New Jersey
Faulkner Act (mayor–council)
Populated places established in 1693
Townships in Middlesex County, New Jersey